The Tharia Cave paintings are prehistoric paintings which have been discovered in March 2015 at Tharia Cave, the most ancient rock shelter in Pabu Mountain, located near the Qili village, Chatoka Bhit , Pallimas valley, Tahseel Wadh, Khuzdar District of Balochistan, a western province of Pakistan. The paintings represented on rock shelter are divided into five panels. The Tharia Cave paintings show dancing men in a row and in straight line, humped bulls and deer-like animals. Most probably, the cave paintings belong to the Paleolithic period.

References

Cave paintings
Paleolithic Asia
Rock shelters